Rhizophagus dimidiatus is a species of root-eating beetle in the family Monotomidae. It is found in North America.

References

Further reading

 
 

Monotomidae
Articles created by Qbugbot
Beetles described in 1843